Kindig is a surname of German origin. Notable people with the surname include:

Howard Kindig (born 1941), American football player
James W. Kindig, American judge
John M. Kindig (died 1869), Union Army officer and Medal of Honor recipient
Richard H. Kindig (1916–2008), American photographer
Thomas Kindig (born 1996), Austrian footballer
Will H. Kindig (1869–1946), American politician

References

Surnames of German origin